The Parrah barb (Puntius parrah) is a species of ray-finned fish in the genus Puntius. It is found in Kerala, Karnataka and Tamil Nadu in India.

References 

Puntius
Taxa named by Francis Day
Fish described in 1865